The Church of the Holy Seal (Surb Nshan yekeghetsi, Sourfnishani) is an 18th-century Armenian church in Old Tbilisi, Georgia.  It was built between 1703 and 1711, and reconstructed in 1780.

Current state 
The church lies dilapidated and was recently partially destroyed by arson.

Gallery

See also 
 Armenians in Georgia

References

External links 
 Photos of Surb Nshan after the arson fire

Armenian churches in Tbilisi
Old Tbilisi
Churches destroyed by arson
Armenian Apostolic churches in Tbilisi